Rick Hilles is an American poet.

Life
Rick Hilles was born in Canton, Ohio (on November 25) and grew up in North Canton (formerly "New Berlin"), Ohio, where he attended North Canton Montessori before entering the public schools, receiving his diploma from Hoover High School.

After receiving a scholarship to attend the Columbus College of Art & Design (where he studied drawing, design, and painting intensively for a year), he received his B.A. and L.S.M. from Kent State University and his M.F.A. in creative writing (poetry) from Columbia University.

His poems have appeared in Poetry, Paris Review, The Nation, The New Republic, Salmagundi, Witness, Missouri Review, and translations have appeared in Field and Harper's.

He was a Stegner Fellow in Poetry at Stanford University and the Ruth and Jay C. Halls Poetry Fellow at the University of Wisconsin in Madison, where he taught creative writing and poetry. He has also done graduate work at Rice and the University of Houston, where he also taught. From 2001 to 2005, he was a Visiting Lecturer in the English Department at the University of Michigan, where he taught poetry courses in literature and creative writing.

Since 2005, he has taught undergraduate and graduate courses in literature and creative writing (poetry) as an assistant professor at Vanderbilt University.

Awards
 2009 Camargo Fellow, Cassis, France (Fall).
 2008 Whiting Award.
 2006 Brother Salvage named 2006 Poetry Book of the Year by ForeWord magazine. 
 2005 Agnes Lynch Starrett Poetry Prize for Brother Salvage (published in September 2006 by the University of Pittsburgh Press).
 2002-2003 Amy Lowell Poetry Travelling Scholarship.
 1999-2000 Ruth and Jay C. Halls Fellow at the University of Wisconsin–Madison.
 1995-1997 Wallace Stegner Fellow at Stanford.

Works

Anthologies
 From the Other World: Poems in Memory of James Wright. Lost Hills Books, 2008.
 Blood to Remember: American Poets on the Holocaust. Time Being Books, 2007.
 Jewish in America. University of Michigan Press, 2004.
 Red, White, & Blues: Poetic Vistas on the Promise of America. University of Iowa Press, 2004.
 I Have My Own Song For It: Modern Poems About Ohio. University of Akron Press, 2002.

Books

 My Roberto Clemente. C&R Press. 2021. ISBN 978-1949540284
 A Map of the Lost World. University of Pittsburgh Press. 2012. .
 
 Preparing for Flight and Other Poems. Pudding House Publications, 2005. .

Reviews
If Brother Salvage were Rick Hilles’, say, third collection, not his first as it is; if the versatility and dynamism of voice in these poems signaled a poet’s maturation from the safer outings of his youth; if we could’ve foreseen this kind of command of histories and their peculiar narrators, the book would merely astonish. Instead, Rick Hilles has leapt onto poetry’s stage in a debut both transporting and grounding, clever though never once inclined to wink at you.

Rick Hilles's first collection, is constructed upon an ambitious intellectual edifice that both grounds and ties together the disparate personal and historical materials of the poems. The books central metaphor is that of the genizah, a Hebrew word for "hiding place," which an epigraph to the title poem explains is "a depository where old and/or worn-out secular, holy & heretical books are kept inviolate ... Genizot serve the twin purpose of protecting what they contain and preventing their more dangerous contents from causing harm."

References

External links
 "Interview with Rick Hilles", Wick Poetry Center, October 2, 2007
 "Interview: Poet--Rick Hilles", The Southeast Review, September 26, 2010
Profile at The Whiting Foundation

Kent State University alumni
Columbia University School of the Arts alumni
Vanderbilt University faculty
American male poets
Writers from Canton, Ohio
People from North Canton, Ohio
Living people
Agnes Lynch Starrett Poetry Prize winners
Year of birth missing (living people)
Poets from Ohio